Claude Howard Sullivan (December 29, 1924 – December 6, 1967) was an American sports broadcaster. Born in Winchester, Kentucky, he did the play-by-play broadcasts of the University of Kentucky football and basketball games for nearly 20 years.  He was associated with Lexington radio station WVLK, and was appointed director of programming by the station in addition to his sports broadcasting duties.

In 1964, he was hired to work alongside of Baseball Hall of Fame pitcher Waite Hoyt as broadcaster of the Cincinnati Reds' Major League Baseball games.  When Hoyt retired in 1965, Sullivan took over the primary play-by-play responsibilities.  But after two years, Sullivan was diagnosed with throat cancer, and he died on December 6, 1967, at the age of 42.

References

External links
Guide to the Claude Sullivan Collection of Athletic Publications, 1964-1967 housed at the University of Kentucky Libraries Special Collections Research Center

1924 births
1967 deaths
American radio sports announcers
Cincinnati Reds announcers
College basketball announcers in the United States
Kentucky Wildcats football announcers
Major League Baseball broadcasters
People from Winchester, Kentucky
Radio personalities from Kentucky